Adam Azimov is a Canadian film director.  He is an alumnus of the Canadian Film Centre, where he participated in the Cineplex Entertainment Film Program (Directors' Lab) and the Short Dramatic Film Program.

Azimov grew up in Montreal, and attended Concordia University there.  According to the Concordia Journal, Azimov and fellow student Shaughn McArthur were about to travel to Uganda, to make a documentary film, under the auspices of the Concordia Volunteer Abroad Program.

In 2012 Asimov directed a short documentary about Manitobah Mukluks, a First Nations company that manufactured traditional beaded mukluks intended to make this form of footwear fashionable.

Azimov won the Short Film award at the Reelworld Film Festival.  Azimov has specialized in short films, and commercials.

In 2019 Asimov chose to move from being a freelance director to being represented by the Artclass agency.

References

External links
 

Film directors from Montreal
Year of birth missing (living people)
Living people
Canadian Film Centre alumni